Joel Sutherland may refer to:

 Joel A. Sutherland (born 1980), Canadian author
 Joel Barlow Sutherland (1792–1861), member of the U.S. House of Representatives from Pennsylvania